Austromordella is a genus of beetles in the family Mordellidae, containing the following species:

 Austromordella demarzi Ermisch, 1963
 Austromordella niveosuturalis (Lea, 1917)
 Austromordella tarsata Ermisch, 1950
 Austromordella verticordiae (Lea, 1902)

References

Mordellinae
Mordellidae genera